Necmi Onarıcı (2 November 1925 – 21 August 1968) was a Turkish football forward who played for Turkey in the 1954 FIFA World Cup. He also played for Adalet SK Istanbul.

References

External links
 
 

1925 births
1968 deaths
People from Kadıköy
Turkish footballers
Turkey international footballers
Association football forwards
1954 FIFA World Cup players
Vefa S.K. footballers
Fenerbahçe S.K. footballers
Footballers from Istanbul